The 1966 Indiana State Sycamores football team represented Indiana State University as a member of the Indiana Collegiate Conference (ICC) during the 1966 NCAA College Division football season. Led by first-year head coach Jerry Huntsman, the Sycamores compiled an overall record of 6–2 with a mark of 4–2 in conference play, tying for second place in the ICC.

The Sycamores were represented on the All-Conference team by: John Truitt, Senior, WR, Joe Fiedler, Senior, Center, Randy Payne, Junior, Halfback and Rob Pychinka, Linebacker.  Ron Overton, Sophomore, Quarterback & Dean Klink, Sophomore, Fullback were named to the Conference Honorable Mention team.

Schedule

References

Indiana State
Indiana State Sycamores football seasons
Indiana State Sycamores football